Abortion in Illinois is legal. Laws about abortion dated to the early 1800s in Illinois; the first criminal penalties related to abortion were imposed in 1827, and abortion itself became illegal in 1867. As hospitals set up barriers in the 1950s, the number of therapeutic abortions declined. Following Roe v. Wade in 1973, Illinois passed a number of restrictions on abortion, many of which have subsequently been repealed. Illinois updated its existing abortion laws in June 2019. The state has seen a decline in the number of abortion clinics over the years, going from 58 in 1982 to 47 in 1992 to 24 in 2014.

A 2014 poll of people in Illinois in 2014 found 56% believed that abortion should be legal in all or most cases. That same year, 38,472 abortion procedures took place in the state, 8.2% by out of state residents. Publicly funded abortions for poor women came from a mix of state and federal resources. Abortion rights activism has been present in the state for many years, with Abortion Counseling Service of the Chicago Women's Liberation Union created in the early 1960s, helping around 12,000 women get abortions between 1969 and 1973. Protests have also taken place, including a #StoptheBans march in Chicago in May 2019. Several anti-abortion rights organizations are also based in Illinois, including Illinois Family Institute (IFI) and the Eagle Trust Fund founded by Phyllis Schlafly. All state statutes placing some restrictions on abortion were later repealed in June 2019.

History 
An 1827 Illinois law prohibited the sale of drugs that could induce abortions. The law classed these medications as a "poison". The 1827 law was the first in the nation to impose criminal penalties in connection with abortion before quickening. 

Illinois passed a bill in 1867 that made abortion and attempted abortion a criminal offense. Around 1870, Illinois passed another law banning the sale of drugs that could cause induced abortions. The law is notable because it allowed an exception for "the written prescription of some well-known and respectable practicing physician". 

The Chicago Times published an undercover exposé on abortion in the city in 1888. One reporter managed to get a referral for an abortion with the head of the Chicago Medical Society. 

In 1956, Mt. Sinai Hospital in Chicago created an anonymous committee to approve all requests for therapeutic abortions. As a result, the number of therapeutic abortions in 1957 was 3, down from 15 the previous year.

The Jane Collective, an underground collective that assisted women in obtaining safe abortions, was founded in Chicago in 1969. The collective trained its members in abortion care and provided more than 11,000 abortions before disbanding in 1973.

The US Supreme Court's 1973 decision in Roe v. Wade meant the state could no longer regulate abortion before the viability of the child. In 1975, the 79th General Assembly enacted the Illinois Abortion Law, which included a trigger law that provided that if Roe v. Wade was overturned or repealed, "the former policy of this State to prohibit abortions unless necessary for the preservation of the mother's life shall be reinstated." 

In 1995, the 89th General Assembly enacted the Parental Notice of Abortion Act, a parental notification law. The Act required physicians to give 48 hours' notice to the parent, grandparent or guardian of a minor seeking an abortion. However, the law was enjoined by the courts for more than two decades. 

A 2013 Guttmacher Institute survey found that Illinois' Targeted Regulation of Abortion Providers (TRAP) law applied to private doctor offices, in addition to abortion clinics. As of 2013, Illinois was among  qualified non-physicians to prescribe drugs for medication abortions only.

In 2017, the 100th General Assembly repealed the trigger law component of the Illinois Abortion Law of 1975, but left many of its other provisions intact. In the same act, the General Assembly provided for abortion to be covered under Medicaid and state employee health insurance. The bill was signed into law by pro-choice Republican governor Bruce Rauner.

Until June 12, 2019, under the Illinois Abortion Law of 1975, state law banned abortions after 12 weeks. The state prohibited abortions after the fetus was viable, generally some point between week 24 and 28, based on the standard defined by the US Supreme Court in 1973 with the Roe v. Wade ruling, not because of legislative action. 

State legislators had introduced a bill in February 2019 to make abortion a right and to remove the 12-week ban from the books. In May 2019 the bill's sponsors demanded action to move this bill ahead, after Alabama and Georgia's state governments passed laws all but restricting abortions. On May 31, 2019, Illinois became the eleventh state to pass bills protecting abortion rights in the state in response to anti-abortion legislation being passed elsewhere. The bills, pushed through by the Democratic-controlled House and Senate and known as the Illinois Reproductive Health Act, provided statutory protections for abortions, and rescinded previous legislation that banned some late-term abortions and a 45-year-old law that had made performing such abortions a criminal offense. After the bill passed, Governor Pritzker was on the Illinois Senate floor, hugging and congratulating abortion-rights supporters. The Illinois Reproductive Health Act says that women have the "fundamental right" to access abortion services, and that a "fertilized egg, embryo, or fetus does not have independent rights". Pritzker signed the bill into law on June 12, 2019.

In fall 2021, the General Assembly passed a bill to repeal the Parental Notice of Abortion Act. Governor Pritzker signed it into law on December 17, 2021. Thus, as of June 1, 2022, Illinois does not require a minor to notify a parent or guardian in order to obtain an abortion.

The Supreme Court overturned Roe v. Wade in Dobbs v. Jackson Women's Health Organization,  later in 2022.

Clinic history 

Between 1982 and 1992, the number of abortion clinics in the state decreased by 11, going from 58 in 1982 to 47 in 1992. In 2014, there were 24 abortion clinics in the state. 92% of the counties in the state did not have an abortion clinic. That year, 40% of women in the state aged 15–44 lived in a county without an abortion clinic. In 2017, there were 17 Planned Parenthood clinics, 11 of which offered abortion services in a state with a population of 3,003,374 women aged 15–49. Following the announcement in late-May 2019 that the last remaining abortion clinic in the state of Missouri would likely close because it was unable to meet new state licensing rules, abortion clinics in Illinois prepared for an influx of new patients by hiring additional staff and increasing their opening hours. Hope Clinic in Granite City was one of the clinics most likely to be impacted because of its location relative to St. Louis, Missouri.

Statistics 
In the period between 1972 and 1974, the state had an illegal abortion mortality rate per million women aged 15–44 of between 0.1 and 0.9. In 1990, 1,402,000 women in the state faced the risk of an unintended pregnancy. In 2014, 56% of adults said in a poll by the Pew Research Center that abortion should be legal vs. 41% that believe it should be illegal in all or most cases. In 2017, the state had an infant mortality rate of 6.1 deaths per 1,000 live births.

Abortion financing 

Seventeen states including Illinois used their own funds to cover all or most "medically necessary" abortions sought by low-income women under Medicaid, thirteen of which are required by State court orders to do so. In 2010, the state had 371 publicly funded abortions, of which were 237 federally and 134 were state funded.

Criminal prosecution 
Between 1974 and May 2019, there was a law that said that anyone who performed a late term abortion could be charged criminally with that offense. No one was ever charged with violating that law.

Abortion rights activism

Organizations 
The Jane Collective, which began as the Abortion Counseling Service of the Chicago Women's Liberation Union, was established by Chicago-area feminists as a way to try to provide local women with safe and affordable illegal abortions during the late 1960s and early 1970s. According to Laura Kaplan who wrote a history of the group, members assisted women in having 11,000 safe abortions. Another estimate put the total abortions assisted by the group as 12,000 between 1969 and 1973.

The Chicago Abortion Fund was established in 1985, which assists low-income people in obtaining abortions. In 1994, Mary Morten became board chair and recruited Toni Bond as CEO. Both women were African American, which at the time was unique among the leadership of pro-choice organizations in Illinois.

Activities 

Webster v. Reproductive Health Services was before the US Supreme Court in 1989. The Court ruled in a case over a Missouri law that banned abortions being performed in public buildings unless there was a need to save the life of the mother, required physicians to determine if a fetus was past 20 weeks and was viable in addition to other restrictions on a woman's ability to get an abortion. The US Supreme Court largely ruled in favor of the law, but made clear that this was not an overruling of Roe v. Wade. As a response to this Supreme Court decision, the radical feminist art collective Sister Serpents was formed in Chicago to empower women and to increase awareness of women's issues through radical art.

Protests 
Women from the state participated in marches supporting abortion rights as part of a #StoptheBans movement in May 2019. Many women in Chicago wore red, referencing women in Margaret Atwood's The Handmaid's Tale.

Anti-abortion activities and views

Organizations 
Illinois Family Institute (IFI), a Christian nonprofit organization opposed to abortion, separation of church and state, "activist judges", the "marriage penalty", civil unions, same-sex marriage, gambling and drug legalization based in Illinois.

In 1967, Phyllis Schlafly launched the Eagle Trust Fund in Chicago, Illinois for receiving donations related to conservative causes. The Eagle Forum was pegged by Schlafly as "the alternative to women's lib." It is opposed to a number of feminist issues, which founder Phyllis Schlafly claimed were "extremely destructive" and "poisoned the attitudes of many young women." The organization believes only in a family consisting of a father, mother and children. They are supportive of women's role as "fulltime homemakers", and opposed to same-sex marriage. Eagle Forum opposes abortion and has defended the push for government defunding of Planned Parenthood.

Activities 
After the 1972 proposal of the Equal Rights Amendment (ERA), Schlafly reorganized her efforts to defeat its ratification, founding the group "Stop ERA" and starting the Eagle Forum Newsletter. In 1975, Stop ERA was renamed the Eagle Forum. According to Schlafly, the passage of the ERA could "mean Government-funded abortions, homosexual schoolteachers, women forced into military combat and men refusing to support their wives." The newsletter began to circulate, and many conservative women wrote to their legislators, relaying the concerns voiced by Schlafly in the Eagle Forum Newsletter. Support for The Eagle Forum grew with the support of many conservative women and various church groups, as did the opposition to the ERA. Many of the same women who had helped Schlafly distribute her book were involved with STOP ERA. Less than a year after its creation, STOP ERA had grown to several thousand members.

The Pro-Life Action League became active in Chicago in 1980, and tried to disrupt the ability of women to seek abortions by engaging in a variety of tactics, including "sidewalk counseling", sit-ins, and disrupting the water and sewage supplies to abortion clinics. The group's leader, Joe Scheidler, published a book in 1985, called Closed: 99 Ways to Stop Abortion.

The methods used by Pro-life Action League would later become known as the "Chicago Method", which relied on an approach to sidewalk counseling that involves giving those about to enter an abortion facility copies of lawsuits filed against the facility or its physicians.

Activism 
Beginning in 1983, American Catholic Cardinal Joseph Bernardin argued that abortion, euthanasia, capital punishment, and unjust war are all related, and all wrong. He said that "to be truly 'pro-life,' you have to take all of those issues into account."

Donations 
Following the passage of abortion bans in Alabama, Georgia and Mississippi in early 2019, Pro-Life Action League saw an increase in donations and people asking to volunteer to help the organization.

Violence 
1982 saw a surge in attacks on abortion clinics in the United States with at least four arson attacks and one bombing. One attack occurred in Illinois and one in Virginia. Two occurred in Florida. These five attacks caused over US$1.1 million in damage. In August 1982, three men identifying as the Army of God kidnapped Hector Zevallos (an abortion doctor and abortion clinic owner) and his wife, Rosalee Jean, holding them for eight days.

On September 30, 2000, John Earl, a Catholic priest, drove his car into the Northern Illinois Health Clinic after learning that the FDA had approved the drug RU-486. He pulled out an ax before being forced to the ground by the owner of the building, who fired two warning shots from a shotgun.

References 

Illinois
Healthcare in Illinois
Women in Illinois